Pacifiction is a 2022 internationally co-produced film written and directed by Albert Serra. The film premiered at the 2022 Cannes Film Festival, where it competed for the Palme d'Or. The film title is a portmanteau of the words Pacific and fiction.

Plot
"On the French Polynesian island of Tahiti, the High Commissioner of the Republic and French government official De Roller is a calculating man with flawless manners. His somewhat broad perception of his role brings him to navigate the high-end 'establishment' as well as shady venues where he mingles with the locals. A persistent rumour also has been going around: The sighting of a submarine with a ghostly presence could herald the return of French nuclear testing."

Cast

Release
The film screened at the 75th Cannes Film Festival on 26 May 2022. Distributed by Elastica, it was released theatrically in Spain on 2 September 2022. It was released by Les films du losange in France on 9 November 2022.

Reception
On Rotten Tomatoes, the film holds an approval rating of 93% based on 30 reviews, with an average rating of 8.6/10. The website's consensus reads, "Narratively sparse and visually vast, Pacifiction is a tsunami of a political thriller that philosophically rewards those willing to weather it." According to Metacritic, which assigned a weighted average score of 79 out of 100 based on 8 critics, the film received "generally favorable reviews".

Reviewing the film following its Cannes premiere, Peter Bradshaw of The Guardian wrote that he was "captivated by the film and its stealthy evocation of pure evil." Christian Blauvelt of IndieWire wrote, "Pacifiction is not a vicarious experience of luxury; it is an experience of life. Set to its own tidal rhythm, it is one of the most beautiful and rigorously introspective movies of this or any year." The Hollywood Reporters Leslie Felperin called it "Punishingly slow, though not uninteresting." Guy Lodge of Variety wrote, "Provided they stick with the film's luxuriantly gradual pacing... there are rewards here even for more bemused viewers caught in its tide." Nando Salvá of Cinemanía rated the film 4½ out of 5 stars, underscoring the film to be "Romantic. Seductive. Hypnotic. Overwhelming" as a veredict.

Top ten lists 
The film also appeared (and topped) some critics' top ten lists of the best films of 2022:
 1st — Cahiers du Cinéma (staff consensus) 1st — ScreenDaily (Jonathan Romney)
 5th — Artforum'' (James Quandt)

It also appeared on a number of critics' top ten lists of the best European films of 2022:

Accolades 

|-
| align = "center" | 2022 || Louis Delluc Prize || colspan = "2" | Best Film of the Year ||  || 
|-
| rowspan = "26" align = "center" | 2023 
| rowspan = "5" | 28th Lumières Awards || colspan = "2" | Best Film ||  || rowspan = "5" align = "center" | 
|-
| Best Director || Albert Serra || 
|-
| Best Actor || Benoît Magimel || 
|-
| Best Cinematography || Artur Tort || 
|-
| Best Music || Marc Verdaguer || 
|-
| rowspan = "11" | 15th Gaudí Awards || colspan = "2" | Best Non-Catalan Language Film ||  || rowspan = "11" | 
|-
| Best Director || Albert Serra || 
|-
| Best Actor || Benoît Magimel || 
|-
| Best Original Screenplay || Albert Serra || 
|-
| Best Cinematography || Artur Tort || 
|-
| Best Editing || Albert Serra, Artur Tort, Ariadna Ribas || 
|-
| Best Production Supervision || Clàudia Robert || 
|-
| Best Art Direction || Sebastian Vogler || 
|-
| Best Costume Design || Práxedes de Villalonga || 
|-
| Best Makeup and Hairstyles || Aurélie Vigouroux, Maryline Montibert || 
|-
| Best Original Score || Marc Verdaguer, Joe Robinson || 
|-
| 10th Feroz Awards || colspan = "2" | Arrebato Award (Fiction) ||  || align = "center" | 
|-
| rowspan="9"| 48th César Awards || colspan = "2" | Best Film ||  || align="center" rowspan="9"|
|-
| Best Director || Albert Serra || 
|-
| Best Actor || Benoît Magimel || 
|-
| Best Cinematography || Artur Tort || 
|-
| Best Original Music || Marc Verdaguer, Joe Robinson || 
|-
| Best Costume Design || Praxedes de Vilallonga || 
|-
| Best Production Design || Sebastian Vogler || 
|-
| Best Sound || Jordi Ribas, Benjamin Laurent, Bruno Tarriere || 
|-
| Best Visual Effects || Marco del Bianco || 
|-
|}

See also 
 List of French films of 2022
 List of Spanish films of 2022

References

External links
 

2022 drama films
2022 films
2020s French films
2020s Spanish films
2020s German films
French drama films
Spanish drama films
Portuguese drama films
German drama films
Films set in Polynesia
Films shot in Tahiti
Films directed by Albert Serra
French LGBT-related films
Spanish LGBT-related films
Portuguese LGBT-related films
German LGBT-related films
2022 LGBT-related films
LGBT-related drama films